"Love Again" is the third single from Canadian/Jamaican singer Kreesha Turner's second album, Tropic Electric. The song was written by Turner, Jon Levine, and Shawn Desman, who also produced the track. The song was sent to radios in early April, and was put on iTunes for digital download on April 10, 2012.
The song was announced as a single in early February, by Kreesha, through her Backstage Pass iPhone application. The single artwork for the song is a picture from Kreesha's photo shoot for Eckō Unltd.

French version
Along with the release, a French version of the song, titled 'Donne-Moi Ton Amour', was recorded, and uploaded to YouTube. The track later was released on iTunes the same day as the radio edit of the song.

Music video
A music video for the song was released Tuesday, May 1, 2012, on Kreesha Turner's official VEVO channel.

Charts

Track listing

Radio edit

French version

References

2012 singles
Kreesha Turner songs
EMI Records singles
Capitol Records singles
Songs written by Jon Levine
2011 songs
Songs written by Kreesha Turner